Bathurstia was a genus of scrambling Silu-Devonian land plant with isotomously branching axes that grew to heights of 30 cm. It is aligned with the Zosterophylls, and produced Calamospora-type spores.

References 

Silurian plants
Paleozoic life of Nunavut
Zosterophylls
Prehistoric lycophyte genera